Sir John Pointz or Poyntz (died 1633) was an English landowner and politician who sat in the House of Commons in 1593. He is perhaps best remembered as the maternal grandfather of James Butler, 1st Duke of Ormond.

Life
Pointz was the son of Sir Nicholas Poyntz of Iron Acton, Gloucestershire and his first wife Anne Verney. His grandfather Sir Nicholas Poynz was a courtier in the time of Henry VIII. His father was widely suspected of being a Roman Catholic.

He was appointed High Sheriff of Gloucestershire for 1591–92 and was J.P. in 1592. He was knighted before 1593, when he was elected Member of Parliament for Gloucestershire. From 1602 he was Custos Rotulorum of the county. He was Lord of the Manor of Iron Acton.

Pointz, who was notoriously improvident, and was imprisoned for debt several times, died insolvent and intestate in 1633. In fairness to him, he had been embroiled for many years in a lawsuit about his father's will. was buried at Iron Acton.

Family
Pointz married four times: firstly Ursula Sydenham of Brampton, Somerset; secondly Elizabeth Sydenham, daughter of Alexander Sydenham with whom he had four sons and three daughters, including Robert and Elizabeth; thirdly Frances, daughter of John Newton; and fourthly Grissell (died 1648), the daughter of Walter Roberts of Glassenbury, Kent and widow of Gregory Price of Hereford, and of Gervase Gibbons of Kent, with whom he had another two sons and three daughters. His son Robert was later MP for Gloucestershire. His daughter Elizabeth, Lady Thurles, was the mother of the leading Irish statesman, James Butler, 1st Duke of Ormond.

References

Year of birth missing
1633 deaths
English MPs 1593
English landowners
High Sheriffs of Gloucestershire
Place of birth missing
Politicians from Gloucestershire